"Jailhouse Rock" is a song recorded by American singer Elvis Presley for the film of the same name. It was written by Jerry Leiber and Mike Stoller. RCA Victor released the song on a 45 rpm single on September 24, 1957, as the first single from the film's soundtrack EP. It reached the top of the charts in the U.S. and the top 10 in several other countries. The song has been recognized by the Grammy Hall of Fame, the American Film Institute, and others.

Characters and themes
Some of the characters named in the song are real people. Shifty Henry was a well-known Los Angeles musician, not a criminal. The Purple Gang was a real mob. "Sad Sack" was a U.S. Army nickname in World War II for a loser, which was also the name of a popular comic strip and comic book character.

According to Rolling Stone, Leiber and Stoller's "theme song for Presley's third movie was decidedly silly, the kind of tongue-in-cheek goof they had come up with for The Coasters. Presley, however, sang it as straight rock & roll, overlooking the jokes in the lyrics (like the suggestion of gay romance when inmate Number 47 tells Number 3, 'You're the cutest jailbird I ever did see') and then introducing Scotty Moore's guitar solo with a cry so intense that the take almost collapses." Gender studies scholars cite the song for "its famous reference to homoerotics behind bars," while music critic Garry Mulholland writes, "'Jailhouse Rock' was always a queer lyric, in both senses." Douglas Brode writes of the filmed production number that it's "amazing that the sequence passed by the censors".

Releases and chart performance
The single, with its B-side "Treat Me Nice" (another song from the film's soundtrack) was a US number one hit for seven weeks in the fall of 1957, and a UK number one hit for three weeks early in 1958. In addition, "Jailhouse Rock" spent one week at the top of the US country charts, and reached the number one position on the R&B chart.

Also in 1957, "Jailhouse Rock" was the lead song in an EP (extended play single), together with other songs from the film, namely "Young and Beautiful", "I Want to Be Free", "Don't Leave Me Now" and "(You're So Square) Baby I Don't Care" (but with "Treat Me Nice" omitted). It topped the Billboard EP charts, eventually selling two million copies and earning a double-platinum RIAA certification.

Personnel 
Credits sourced from AFM union contracts and label records.

 Elvis Presley lead vocals and acoustic guitar
 The Jordanaires backing vocals
 Bill Black double bass
 Scotty Moore electric guitar
 D. J. Fontana drums
 Dudley Brooks piano

Legacy
Rolling Stone magazine included "Jailhouse Rock" at number 67 on its list of The 500 Greatest Songs of All Time and it was named one of The Rock and Roll Hall of Fame's 500 Songs that Shaped Rock and Roll. In 2004, it finished at number 21 on AFI's 100 Years...100 Songs survey of top tunes in American cinema. On November 27, 2016, the Grammy Hall of Fame announced its induction, along with that of another 24 songs. In 2019, the song ranked number 31 on Spanish radio station Rock FM 500's list of "Five Hundred Rockers of All Time", ahead of any other song of the 1950s.

Charts and certifications

Weekly charts

Year-end charts

Sales and certifications

See also
List of Top 25 singles for 1957 in Australia
List of Billboard number-one rhythm and blues hits
List of Billboard number-one singles of 1957
Billboard year-end top 50 singles of 1957
List of Cash Box Best Sellers number-one singles of 1957
List of CHUM number-one singles of 1957
List of number-one country singles of 1957 (U.S.)
List of UK Singles Chart number ones of the 1950s
List of UK Singles Chart number ones of the 2000s

References

1957 singles
1957 songs
Grammy Hall of Fame Award recipients
Billboard Top 100 number-one singles
Number-one singles in Scotland
Number-one singles in South Africa
UK Singles Chart number-one singles
Elvis Presley songs
ZZ Top songs
LGBT-related songs
Songs about dancing
Songs about prison
Film theme songs
Songs written by Jerry Leiber and Mike Stoller
The Beatles songs
The Blues Brothers songs
Songs written for films
RCA Victor singles
Mötley Crüe songs